KRCM (1380 AM) is a terrestrial AM radio station, licensed to Shenandoah, Texas. The station broadcasts a Spanish Religious format as "Radio Vida 1380" and is owned by Daij Media, LLC.

History
KRCM originated in Beaumont, Texas as KPBX in 1947.

During the 1950s and 1960s, KRCM was known as KJET, a blues and R&B station. It was the only black station in Beaumont. Johnny Winter said that he "spent hours each day listening to KJET" and it heavily influenced his music styles.  KJET (known on as air "K-Jet") continued through the 1980s, even as it faced competition from both FM operators and KALO, which had dropped country during the decade to become the Triangle's second Black targeted station as "Kay-Lo".

The facility relocated to a site east of Tamina Road in Shenandoah, TX in 2007.
 
As of 18 January 2017, KRCM has received the grant officially increasing the daytime power level from 2.8 to 22 kilowatts, while the night power has decreased to 50 watts, down from 60.

References

External links
KRCM's official website

RCM
Montgomery County, Texas
RCM
1947 establishments in Texas
Radio stations established in 1947